Phenylobacterium koreense is a Gram negative, non-spore-forming, rod-shaped and aerobic bacterium from the genus of Phenylobacterium which has been isolated from activated sludge from a wastewater treatment plant from Daejeon in Korea.

References

Caulobacterales
Bacteria described in 2005